Arne Skauge (born 27 January 1948) is a Norwegian politician for the Conservative Party, who served as parliamentary representative for Hordaland from 1977 to 1993. He was also Minister of Trade and Shipping 1981-1983 (as well as minister of Nordic cooperation), state secretary to the Prime Minister 1984–1986, and Minister of Finance in 1986 and 1989–1990.

References

1948 births
Living people
Ministers of Finance of Norway
Ministers of Trade and Shipping of Norway
Members of the Storting
Conservative Party (Norway) politicians
20th-century Norwegian politicians